The polo competitions at the 2019 Southeast Asian Games in the Philippines were held at the Miguel Romero Polo Field in Calatagan, Batangas.

Competition schedule
The two polo events, 0–2 low goal and 4–6 high goal took place from 24 November to 8 December 2019. Due to Typhoon Kammuri (Tisoy) matches scheduled for 3, 4, and 6 December were postponed to 5, 6, and 8 December with the gold and bronze medal matches pushed to 9 December.

Venue
Polo was held in two venues: the Miguel Romero Polo Field in Calatagan, Batangas, a newly-renovated venue inaugurated on 23 November 2019 which was formerly known as the Globalport Polo Field. and the Iñigo Zobel Polo Field.

Format
Playing rules set by the Hurlingham Polo Association were used for these polo events.

Participating nations
Four nations participated in two events in polo. Each participating country was eligible to nominate 24 horses for either of the two event. Brunei brought in 45 horses in preparation for their participation while Indonesia and Malaysia opted not to bring their own horses.

Squads

Results

0–2 low goal

Qualifiying league

Final round

Final

4–6 high goal

Qualifiying league

Final round

Bronze medal game

Final

Medalists

Notes

References

External links
 

2019
2019 Southeast Asian Games events
Sports in Batangas